The European Mobile Payment Systems Association (EMPSA) is an association that aims to foster collaboration and to enable the use of different mobile payments systems internationally. EMPSA is headquartered in Zurich, Switzerland and chaired by Søren Mose, the Chairman of the TWINT Board of Directors.

History and future plans
European Mobile Payment Systems Association was founded on September 3 2019. 

In January 2022 EMPSA demonstrated a working system where test users of TWINT could pay in selected shops in Austria accepting Bluecode.

Members
EMPSA was founded by seven mobile payment providers, including the three Scandinavian providers which at that time had more than half their population as users.

Seven more providers have joined, making them 14; they are:

References

Mobile payments